Marriage in Judaism is the documentation of a contract between a Jewish man and a Jewish woman in which God is involved. In Judaism, a marriage can end either because of a divorce document given by the man to his wife, or by the death of either party. Certain details, primarily as protections for the wife, were added in Talmudic times.

Non-Orthodox developments have brought changes in who may marry whom. Intermarriage is often discouraged, though opinions vary.

Overview

Historic view
In traditional Judaism, marriage is viewed as a contractual bond commanded by God in which a man and a woman come together to create a relationship in which God is directly involved. Though procreation is not the sole purpose, a Jewish marriage is traditionally expected to fulfil the commandment to have children. In this view, marriage is understood to mean that the husband and wife are merging into a single soul, which is why a man is considered "incomplete" if he is not married, as his soul is only one part of a larger whole that remains to be unified.

Rashi explains the verse 'becoming one flesh' (of a man and a woman) as referring to children, whereas Nachmanides understands the verse as referring to sexual union/bonding. Both views are Orthodox and normative; both are interpretations of the Biblical verse discussing the union between a man and a woman.

Recent non-Orthodox views
Non-Orthodox Jewish denominations, such as Reconstructionist, Reform, and Conservative Judaism, recognize same-sex marriage, and de-emphasize procreation, focusing on marriage as a bond between a couple. This view is considered as a diversion from the Jewish Law by the Orthodox denominations, rather than as a legitimate, alternative interpretation.

Betrothal and marriage 

In Talmudic times, these two ceremonies usually took place up to a year apart; the bride lived with her parents until the actual marriage ceremony, which would take place in a room or tent that the groom had set up for her. Since the Middle Ages the two ceremonies have taken place as a combined ceremony performed in public.

According to the Talmud,  involves the groom handing an object to the bride – either an object of value such as a ring, or a document stating that she is being betrothed to him. In order to be valid, this must be done in the presence of two unrelated male witnesses. After , the laws of adultery apply, and the marriage cannot be dissolved without a religious divorce. After , the couple may live together.

The act of  may be made by the intending parties or by their respective parents or other relatives on their behalf with their consent. A man and a woman cannot be betrothed to one another without agency and consent. After the reading, the mothers of the future bride and groom break a plate. Today, some sign the contract on the day of the wedding, some do it as an earlier ceremony, and some do not do it at all. It should also be emphasized that this practice is not explicitly mentioned in the Hebrew Bible.

The young couple is not forced to marry if either does not accept the other.

Matrimony

Marital harmony 

The Talmud states that a man should love his wife as much as he loves himself, and honour her more than he honours himself; indeed, one who honours his wife was said, by the classical rabbis, to be rewarded with wealth. Similarly, a husband was expected to discuss with his wife any worldly matters that might arise in his life. The Talmud forbids a husband from being overbearing to his household, and domestic abuse by him was also condemned. It was said of a wife that "God counts her tears".

As for the wife, the greatest praise the Talmudic rabbis offered to any woman was that given to a wife who fulfils the wishes of her husband; to this end, an early midrash states that a wife should not leave the home "too frequently". A wife, also, was expected to be modest, even when alone with her husband. God's presence dwells in a pure and loving home.

Conjugal rights and obligations 
Marriage obligations and rights in Judaism are ultimately based on those apparent in the Bible, which have been clarified, defined, and expanded on by many prominent rabbinic authorities throughout history.

Traditionally, the obligations of the husband include providing for his wife. He is obligated to provide for her sustenance for her benefit; in exchange, he is also entitled to her income. However, this is a right to the wife, and she can release her husband of the obligation of sustaining her, and she can then keep her income exclusively for herself.

The Bible itself gives the wife protections, as per Exodus 21:10, although the rabbis may have added others later. The rights of the husband and wife are described in tractate  in the Talmud, which explains how the rabbis balanced the two sets of rights of the wife and the husband.

According to the non-traditional view, in the Bible the wife is treated as a possession owned by her husband, but later Judaism imposed several obligations on the husband, effectively giving the wife several rights and freedoms; indeed, being a Jewish wife was often a more favourable situation than being a wife in many other cultures. For example, the Talmud establishes the principle that a wife is entitled, but not compelled, to the same dignity and social standing as her husband, and is entitled to keep any additional advantages she had as a result of her social status before her marriage.

In the Bible 
The words are contrasted in Hosea 2:16, where God speaks to Israel as though it is his wife: "On that day, says the Lord, you will call [me] 'my husband', and will no longer call me 'my master'."

In later times, the Bible describes wives as being given the innermost room(s) of the husband's house, as her own private area to which men were not permitted; in the case of wealthy husbands, the Bible describes their wives as having each been given an entire house for this purpose.

It was not, however, a life of complete freedom. The descriptions of the Bible suggest that a wife was expected to perform certain household tasks: spinning, sewing, weaving, manufacture of clothing, fetching of water, baking of bread, and animal husbandry. The Book of Proverbs contains an entire acrostic about the duties which would be performed by a virtuous wife.

The husband, too, is indirectly implied to have responsibilities to his wife. The Torah obligates a man to not deprive his wife of food, clothing, or of sexual activity; if the husband does not provide the first wife with these things, she is to be divorced, without cost to her. The Talmud interprets this as a requirement for a man to provide food and clothing to, and have sex with, each of his wives, even if he only has one.

As a  society, the Israelites did not have any laws which imposed monogamy on men. Adulterous married and betrothed women, as well as their male accomplices, were subject to the death penalty by the biblical laws against adultery. According to the Book of Numbers, if a woman was suspected of adultery, she was to be subjected to the ordeal of the bitter water, a form of trial by ordeal, but one that took a miracle to convict. The literary prophets indicate that adultery was a frequent occurrence, despite their strong protests against it, and these legal strictnesses.

In the Talmud and Rabbinic Judaism 
The Talmud sets a minimum provision which a husband must provide to his wife:
 Enough bread for at least two meals a day
 Sufficient oil for cooking and for lighting purposes
 Sufficient wood for cooking
 Fruit and vegetables
 Wine, if it is customary in the locality for women to drink it
 Three meals on each shabbat consisting of fish and meat
 An allowance of a silver coin each week

Rabbinic courts could compel the husband to make this provision, if he fails to do so voluntarily. The Chatam Sofer, a prominent 19th century halachic decisor, argued that if a man could not provide his wife with this minimum, he should be compelled to divorce her; other Jewish rabbis argued that a man should be compelled to hire himself out, as a day-labourer, if he cannot otherwise make this provision to his wife.

According to prominent Jewish writers of the Middle Ages, if a man is absent from his wife for a long period, the wife should be allowed to sell her husband's property, if necessary to sustain herself. Similarly, they argued that if a wife had to take out a loan to pay for her sustenance during such absence, her husband had to pay the debt on his return.

In order to offset the husband's duty to support his wife, she was required by the Talmud to surrender all her earnings to her husband, together with any profit she makes by accident, and the right of usufruct on her property; the wife was not required to do this if she wished to support herself. Although the wife always retained ownership of her property itself, if she died while still married to her husband, he was to be her heir, according to the opinion of the Talmud; this principle, though, was modified, in various ways, by the rabbis of the Middle Ages.

Home and household 
In Jewish tradition, the husband was expected to provide a home for his wife, furnished in accordance to local custom and appropriate to his status; the marital couple were expected to live together in this home, although if the husband's choice of work made it difficult to do so, the Talmud excuses him from the obligation. Traditionally, if the husband changed his usual abode, the wife was considered to have a duty to move with him. In the Middle Ages, it was argued that if a person continued to refuse to live with their spouse, the spouse in question had sufficient grounds for divorce.

Most Jewish religious authorities held that a husband must allow his wife to eat at the same table as him, even if he gave his wife enough money to provide for herself. By contrast, if a husband mistreated his wife, or lived in a disreputable neighbourhood, the Jewish religious authorities would permit the wife to move to another home elsewhere, and would compel the husband to finance her life there.

Expanding on the household tasks which the Bible implies a wife should undertake, rabbinic literature requires her to perform all the housework (such as baking, cooking, washing, caring for her children, etc.), unless her marriage had given the husband a large dowry; in the latter situation, the wife was expected only to tend to "affectionate" tasks, such as making his bed and serving him his food. Jewish tradition expected the husband to provide the bed linen and kitchen utensils. If the wife had young twin children, the Talmud made her husband responsible for caring for one of them.

Clothing 
The Talmud elaborates on the biblical requirement of the husband to provide his wife with clothing, by insisting that each year he must provide each wife with 50 zuzim's-worth of clothing, including garments appropriate to each season of the year. The Talmudic rabbis insist that this annual clothing gift should include one hat, one belt, and three pairs of shoes (one pair for each of the three main annual festivals: Passover, Shabu'ot, and Sukkoth). The husband was also expected by the classical rabbis to provide his wife with jewelry and perfumes if he lived in an area where this was customary.

Physical obligations 
The Talmud argues that a husband is responsible for the protection of his wife's body. If his wife became ill, then he would be compelled, by the Talmud, to defray any medical expense which might be incurred in relation to this; the Talmud requires him to ensure that the wife receives care. Although he technically had the right to divorce his wife, enabling him to avoid paying for her medical costs, several prominent rabbis throughout history condemned such a course of action as inhuman behaviour, even if the wife was suffering from a prolonged illness.

If the wife dies, even if not due to illness, the Talmud's stipulations require the husband to arrange, and pay for, her burial; the burial must, in the opinion of the Talmud, be one conducted in a manner befitting the husband's social status, and in accordance with the local custom. Prominent rabbis of the Middle Ages clarified this, stating that the husband must make any provisions required by local burial customs, potentially including the hiring of mourners and the erection of a tombstone. According to the Talmud, and later rabbinic writers, if the husband was absent, or refused to do these things, a rabbinical court should arrange the wife's funeral, selling some of the husband's property in order to defray the costs.

If the wife was captured, the husband was required by the Talmud and later writers to pay the ransom demanded for her release; there is some debate whether the husband was required only to pay up to the wife's market value as a slave, or whether he must pay any ransom, even to the point of having to sell his possessions to raise the funds. If the husband and wife were both taken captive, the historic Jewish view was that the rabbinic courts should first pay the ransom for the wife, selling some of the husband's property in order to raise the funds.

Fidelity 
In the classical era of the rabbinic scholars, the death penalty for adultery was rarely applied. It forbids conviction if:
 the woman had been raped, rather than consenting to the crime;
 the woman had mistaken the paramour for her husband;
 the woman was unaware of the laws against adultery before she committed the crime;
 the woman had not been properly warned. This requires that the two witnesses testifying against her warn her that the Torah prohibits adultery; that the penalty for adultery is death; and that she immediately responded that she is doing so with full knowledge of those facts. Even if she was warned, but did not acknowledge those facts immediately upon hearing them, and immediately before doing the act, she is not put to death. These conditions apply in all death-penalty convictions.

These rules made it practically impossible to convict any woman of adultery; in nearly every case, women were acquitted. However, due to the belief that a priest should be untainted, a Kohen was compelled to divorce his wife if she had been raped.

In Talmudic times, once the death penalty was no longer enforced for any crime, even when a woman was convicted, the punishment was comparatively mild: adulteresses were flogged instead. Nevertheless, the husbands of convicted adulteresses were not permitted by the Talmud to forgive their guilty wives, instead being compelled to divorce them; according to Maimonides, a conviction for adultery nullified any right that the wife's marriage contract gave her to a compensation payment for being divorced. Once divorced, an adulteress was not permitted, according to the Talmudic writers, to marry her paramour.

As for men who committed adultery (with another man's wife), Abba ben Joseph and Abba Arika are both quoted in the Talmud as expressing abhorrence, and arguing that such men would be condemned to Gehenna.

Family purity 

The laws of "family purity" are considered an important part of an Orthodox Jewish marriage, and adherence to them is (in Orthodox Judaism) regarded as a prerequisite of marriage. This involves observance of the various details of the menstrual  laws. Orthodox brides and grooms attend classes on this subject prior to the wedding. The niddah laws are regarded as an intrinsic part of marital life (rather than just associated with women). Together with a few other rules, including those about the ejaculation of semen, these are collectively termed "family purity".

Sexual relations 
In marriage, conjugal relations are guaranteed as a fundamental right for a woman, along with food and clothing. Sex within marriage is the woman's right, and the man's duty. The husband is forbidden from raping his wife, they are not to be intimate while drunk or while either party is angry at the other. If either partner consistently refuses to participate, that person is considered rebellious, and the other spouse can sue for divorce.

Age of marriage 

Citing the primacy of the divine command given in Genesis 1:28, the time between puberty and age twenty has been considered the ideal time for men and women to be wed in traditional Jewish thought. Some rabbis have gone further to commend the age of eighteen as most ideal, while others have advocated for the time immediately following puberty, closer to the age of fourteen, essentially "as early in life as possible." Babylonian rabbis understood marriage as God's means of keeping male sexuality from going out of control, so they advocated for early marriage to prevent men from succumbing to temptation in their youth. Some commended early marriage for its benefits: Rabbi Ḥisda maintained that early marriage could lead to increased intelligence.

A large age gap between spouses, in either direction, is advised against as unwise. A younger woman marrying a significantly older man however is especially problematic: marrying one's young daughter to an old man was declared as reprehensible as forcing her into prostitution. Moreover, it is problematic for an older man to be unmarried in the first place. Marriage is held to be uniquely mandatory for men, and an unmarried man over the age of twenty is considered "cursed by God Himself."

There is evidence however that in some communities males did not marry until "thirty or older." In medieval Jewish Ashkenazi communities, women continued to be married young. Since the Enlightenment, young marriage has become rarer among Jewish communities.

Consent 
According to the Talmud, a father is commanded not to marry his daughter to anyone until she grows up and says, "I want this one". A marriage that takes place without the consent of the girl is not an effective legal marriage.

A  (literally meaning "little [one]") was any girl between the age of 3 years and that of 12 years plus one day; she was subject to her father's authority, and he could arrange a marriage for her without her agreement. However, after reaching the age of maturity, she would have to agree to the marriage to be considered as married. In these situations, a  would always have the right to annul her marriage, even if it was the first.

If the marriage did end (due to divorce or the husband's death), any further marriages were optional; the  retained her right to annul them. Unlike divorce,  was regarded with distaste by many rabbinic writers, even in the Talmud; in earlier classical Judaism, one major faction – the House of Shammai – argued that such annulment rights only existed during the betrothal (not engagement) period and not once the actual marriage had begun.

Intermarriage 

Rates of marriage between Jews and non-Jews have increased in countries other than Israel (the Jewish diaspora). According to the National Jewish Population Survey 2000-01, 47% of marriages involving Jews in the United States between 1996 and 2001 were with non-Jewish partners. Jewish leaders in different branches generally agree that possible assimilation is a crisis, but they differ on the proper response to intermarriage.

Attitudes

 All branches of Orthodox Judaism do not sanction the validity or legitimacy of intermarriages.
 Conservative Judaism does not sanction intermarriage, but encourages acceptance of the non-Jewish spouse within the family, hoping that such acceptance will lead to conversion.
 Reform Judaism and Reconstructionist Judaism permit total personal autonomy in interpretation of Jewish Law, and intermarriage is not forbidden. Reform and Reconstructionist rabbis are free to take their own approach to performing marriages between a Jewish and non-Jewish partner. Many, but not all, seek agreement from the couple that the children will be raised as Jewish.

There are also differences between streams on what constitutes an intermarriage, arising from their differing criteria for being Jewish in the first place. Orthodox Jews do not accept as Jewish a person whose mother is not Jewish, nor a convert whose conversion was conducted under the authority of a more liberal stream.

Marriage in Israel 

In Israel, the only institutionalized form of Jewish marriage is the religious one, i.e., a marriage conducted under the auspices of the rabbinate. Specifically, marriage of Israeli Jews must be conducted according to Jewish Law, as viewed by Orthodox Judaism. This has led for calls, mostly from the secular segment of the Israeli public, for the institution of civil marriage.

These marriages are legally recognized by the State, but are not recognized by the State Rabbinate.

Marriages performed in Israel must be carried out by religious authorities of an official religion (Judaism, Islam, Christianity, or Druze), unless both parties are without religion.

Divorce 

 (Jewish Law) allows for divorce. The final divorce ceremony involves the husband giving the  document into the hand of the wife or her agent, but the wife may sue in rabbinical court to initiate the divorce. The rationale was that since he was required to divorce his wife due to his (or her) violations of the contract, his good inclination desires to divorce her, and the community helps him to do what he wants to do anyway. In this case, the wife may or may not be entitled to a payment.

Since around the 12th century, Judaism recognized the right of a wife abused physically or psychologically to a divorce.

Conservative Judaism follows halacha, although differently than Orthodox Judaism. They generally do not issue Jewish divorces, seeing a civil divorce as both necessary and sufficient; however, some Reform rabbis encourage the couple to go through a Jewish divorce procedure. Orthodox Judaism does not recognize civil law as overriding religious law, and thus does not view a civil divorce as sufficient. Therefore, a man or woman may be considered divorced by the Reform Jewish community, but still married by the Conservative community. Orthodox Judaism usually does not recognize Reform weddings because according to Talmudic law, the witnesses to the marriage must be Jews who observe , which is seldom the case in reform weddings.

Prior to modern communication, the death of the husband while in a distant land was a common cause of this situation. The term  is often used in such circumstances, but it is not technically accurate.

Within both the Conservative and Orthodox communities, there are efforts to avoid situations where a woman is not able to obtain a Jewish divorce from her husband. The  serves this function in Conservative Judaism in order to prevent husbands from refusing to give their wives a divorce. To do this, the  has built in provisions; so, if predetermined circumstances occur, the divorce goes into effect immediately. After the fact, various Jewish and secular legal methods are used to deal with such problems. None of the legal solutions addresses the  problem in the case of a missing husband.

Same-sex marriage

In antiquity 
The Midrash is one of the few ancient religious texts that makes reference to same-sex marriage. The following teaching can be found twice in the Midrash:

Another important reference is found in the Babylonian Talmud:

In Orthodox Judaism 
Orthodox Judaism does not have a Jewish legal construct of same-gender marriage. Orthodox Judaism does not recognize civil marriages to have theological legal standing, be they civil marriages between male and female, or between two adults of the same gender.

In Conservative Judaism 
In June 2012, the American branch of Conservative Judaism formally approved same-sex marriage ceremonies in a 13–0 vote with one abstention.

In Reform Judaism 
In 1996, the Central Conference of American Rabbis passed a resolution approving same-sex civil marriage. However, this same resolution made a distinction between civil marriages and religious marriages; this resolution thus stated:

In 1998, an ad hoc CCAR committee on human sexuality issued its majority report (11 to 1, 1 abstention) which stated that the holiness within a Jewish marriage "may be present in committed same gender relationships between two Jews and that these relationships can serve as the foundation of stable Jewish families, thus adding strength to the Jewish community." The report called for CCAR to support rabbis in officiating at same-sex marriages. Also in 1998, the Responsa Committee of the CCAR issued a lengthy  (rabbinical opinion) that offered detailed argumentation in support of both sides of the question whether a rabbi may officiate at a commitment ceremony for a same-sex couple.

In March 2000, CCAR issued a new resolution stating that "We do hereby resolve that the relationship of a Jewish, same gender couple is worthy of affirmation through appropriate Jewish ritual, and further resolve, that we recognize the diversity of opinions within our ranks on this issue. We support the decision of those who choose to officiate at rituals of union for same-sex couples, and we support the decision of those who do not."

In Reconstructionist Judaism 
The Reconstructionist Rabbinical Association (RRA) encourages its members to officiate at same-sex marriages, though it does not require it of them.

See also 

 Jewish prenuptial agreement
  (guidelines for physical contact)
  (matchmaker)
  (modest behavior)
  (prohibitions of seclusion with the opposite sex)

Notes

References 

Marriage
Marriage
Marriage
Marriage
Judaism and children
Sexuality and age